Endothelin-converting enzyme 1 (endothelin-converting enzyme, ECE-1) is an enzyme. This enzyme catalyses the following chemical reaction

 Hydrolysis of the -Trp21-Val- bond in big endothelin to form endothelin 1

This metalloendopeptidase belongs to the peptidase family M13.

References

External links 
 

EC 3.4.24